Acrocercops habroscia is a moth of the family Gracillariidae, known from Fiji. It was described by Edward Meyrick in 1921. The hostplant for the species is Calophyllum inophyllum.

References

habroscia
Moths of Oceania
Moths described in 1921